Terwa District ( tərwo wuləswāləi) is a district of Paktika Province, Afghanistan. It was created in 2004 within Waza Khwa District. The estimated population in 2019 was 11,072 .

References

Districts of Paktika Province